E with diaeresis may refer to:

E with diaeresis (Cyrillic) (Ӭ, ӭ) - a Kildin Sami letter
E with diaeresis (Latin) (Ë, ë) - an Albanian, Kashubian and Piedmontese letter

See also
Yo (Cyrillic) (Ё, ё)